The 1958 Kent State Golden Flashes football team was an American football team that represented Kent State University in the Mid-American Conference (MAC) during the 1958 NCAA University Division football season. In their 13th season under head coach Trevor J. Rees, the Golden Flashes compiled a 7–2 record (5–1 against MAC opponents), finished in a tie for second place in the MAC, and outscored all opponents by a combined total of 137 to 95.

The team's statistical leaders included John Martin with 386 rushing yards, quarterback Dick Mostardo with 542 passing yards, and Dick Mihalus with 231 receiving yards. Mostardo was selected as a first-team All-MAC player.

Schedule

References

Kent State
Kent State Golden Flashes football seasons
Kent State Golden Flashes football